Galbraith is an unincorporated community in Kossuth County, in the U.S. state of Iowa.

History
A post office was established at Galbraith in 1902, and remained in operation until it was discontinued in 1913. The community was named for an Iowa senator named Galbraith.

Galbraith's population was 20 in 1925.

References

Unincorporated communities in Kossuth County, Iowa
1902 establishments in Iowa
Populated places established in 1902
Unincorporated communities in Iowa